Sorayya (Persian: The Pleiades) was one of the Persian publications which were published in Cairo, Egypt. The paper was the second Persian newspaper published there and was in circulation between 1898 and 1900. It was among the Persian publications published abroad which contributed to the political awakening of Iranians.

History and profile
The first issue of Sorayya appeared on 31 October 1898. The founding editor was Mirza Ali Mohammad Khan Kashani. The paper was published on a weekly basis and had a secular and liberal approach. It frequently attacked Nasreddine Shah's Prime Minister Amin Al Sultan or known as Atabak. Partly due to its critical approach circulation of Sorayya was banned by the Qajar authorities in Iran. The paper was very popular and influential among the mullahs who were training in Najaf, Iraq.

Due to the conflicts between Kaskani and another editor Farajallah Hosayni Kashani the former left Sorayya and established another Persian publication, Parvaresh in 1900. Sorayya folded after the publication of the issue dated 3 November 1900.

References

1898 establishments in Egypt
1900 disestablishments in Egypt
Defunct newspapers published in Egypt
Defunct weekly newspapers
Egypt–Iran relations
Newspapers published in Cairo
Persian-language newspapers
Publications established in 1898
Publications disestablished in 1900
Non-Arabic-language newspapers published in Egypt
Weekly newspapers published in Egypt